Armin Sandbichler (born 22 January 1985) is an Austrian former professional tennis player.

Born in Schwaz, Sandbichler was a left-handed player and turned professional in 2005. He made his only ATP Tour singles main draw appearance at the 2006 Austrian Open, falling to Dušan Vemić in the first round. In 2007 he reached his career high singles ranking of 421 in the world. He won two singles and five doubles titles at ITF Futures level.

ITF Futures titles

Singles: (2)

Doubles: (5)

References

External links
 
 
 

1985 births
Living people
Austrian male tennis players
Sportspeople from Tyrol (state)
People from Schwaz